Al-Noor School, Arabic: مدرسة النور, is a co-ed gender-separated private school located in the Greenwood Heights neighborhood of Brooklyn, NY.  It is a school dedicated to the teaching of Islamic Culture and Religion, with its curriculum including Arabic, Islamic Studies, and Quran along with traditional subjects such as Math, Science, Social Studies, and English. Admission to Al Noor is based on an entrance exam, personal interview and previous school records.

The school was founded in 1995 and today serves over 650 students. The school runs from Pre-K to the 12th grade, offering Regents High School diplomas.  The first graduating class was in 2002.

School
An annual art fair is held offering prizes to students participants at each school level. The curriculum includes a wide range of AP classes offered including AP Human Geography, AP Calculus, AP Chemistry, AP World History, AP Psychology, AP English, AP Physics, and AP Computer Science AP. The school offers a highly competitive gifted & talented enrichment based program catered towards high school juniors and seniors entering the engineering, design and architecture world in a collaborative program aimed at increasing Muslims and women in science and math fields.

The school participates in the annual MIST, Islamic School Quran Memorization, and Islamic School Spelling bee competitions in the Brooklyn area. The school offers the debate team, competitive urban design squad, math club, drama club, Girls Who Code team, and Model UN. It is a religious school.

Community involvement
The Park Slope Flea Market launched in 2009 is located in the rear of the Al-Noor School 25,000-square-foot parking lot, bringing more than 60 vendors each Saturday and Sunday to the block between Fourth and Fifth avenues. Merchandise ranging from clothing, jewelry, antiques to middle eastern food and clothing takes place starting in May through the fall. Students intern and volunteer at a multitude of organizations including, but not limited to: the Maimonides Medical Center, Methodist Hospital, Museum of Modern Art, the Guggenheim, the MET, Barclays Center, Aviator Sports Arena, Lutheran Hospital, Citibank, Chase and Wells Fargo.

References

External links
http://www.alnoornyc.org

Private high schools in Brooklyn
Private middle schools in Brooklyn
Private elementary schools in Brooklyn
Private K-12 schools in New York City
Islamic schools in New York (state)
Educational institutions established in 1995
1995 establishments in New York City